Narsinghgarh State is a former princely state of the British Raj in India. It formed an enclave within Rajgarh State and was placed administratively under the Bhopal Agency subdivision of the Central India Agency.

The state capital was the town of the same name, Narsinghgarh.

History

The principality was founded in 1681 by a Hindu dynasty whose rulers belonged to the Kshatriya - Parmar clan of Rajputs and claimed descent from Umat, son of Raja Bhoj. The estate was earlier part of Rajgarh State, whose rulers also share same ancestry and from which it was carved as a new estate.The state was a feudatory Jagir to the Holkar rulers of Indore State, but in 1872 Narsinghgarh estate recognized as a state.

After Indian independence in 1947, the rulers of Narsingarh acceded to the Union of India, and the principality was incorporated into the new state of Madhya Bharat in 1948, which subsequently became Madhya Pradesh state on 1 November 1956.

List of Rulers
The rulers of Narsinghgarh State were styled 'Raja', and were entitled to an 11-gun salute.

Rajas  
Rawat Paras Ramji (1681–95)
Rawat Dalel Singhji (1695)
Rawat Moti Singhji (1695–1751)
Rawat Khuman Singhji (1751–66)
Rawat Achal Singhji (1766–95)
Rawat Sobhagh Singhji (1795–1827)
1872 - Mar 1873            Hanwant Singh                      (d. 1873) 
1873 - Apr 1890            Pratap Singh                       (d. 1890) 
28 Jun 1890 - 1896         Mahtab Singh                       (b. 1889 - d. 1896) 
1896 - 22 Apr 1924         Arjun Singh                        (b. 1887 - d. 1924) (from 3 Jun 1916, Sir Arjun Singh)
23 Apr 1924 – 15 Aug 1947  Vikram Singh                       (b. 1909 - d. 1957) (from 1 Jan 1941, Sir Vikram Singh)

References 

Damoh district
Princely states of Madhya Pradesh
Rajputs
1681 establishments in India
1948 disestablishments in India